Ondrej Kružel (born August 23, 1988) is a Slovak male weightlifter, competing in the +105 kg category and representing Slovakia at international competitions. He participated in the men's +105 kg event at the 2011 World Weightlifting Championships, and at the 2016 Summer Olympics, finishing in eighteenth position.

Kruzel was ordered a two-year suspension from the International Weightlifting Federation for using the doping drostanolone in 2012.

Major results

References

1988 births
Living people
Slovak male weightlifters
Place of birth missing (living people)
Doping cases in weightlifting
Weightlifters at the 2016 Summer Olympics
Olympic weightlifters of Slovakia